Daniel Francis Desmond (April 4, 1884—September 11, 1945) was an American prelate of the Roman Catholic Church. He served as bishop of the Diocese of Alexandria in Louisiana from 1933 until his death in 1945.

Biography

Early life 
Daniel Desmond was born on April 4, 1884, in Haverhill, Massachusetts, to Daniel and Catherine (née Lynch) Desmond. His father was a shoemaker from Bandon, County Cork in Ireland. After graduating from St. James High School at Haverhill in 1900, Daniel Desmond studied at Holy Cross College in Worcester, obtaining a Bachelor of Arts degree in 1906. He completed his theological studies at St. John Seminary in Boston.

Priesthood 
Desmond was ordained to the priesthood for the Archdiocese of Boston by Bishop Joseph Anderson on June 9, 1911. He then served as a curate at Our Lady of Lourdes Parish in Beachmont, Massachusetts, until 1912, when he was transferred to St. Joseph Parish in Medford, Massachusetts. During World War I, Desmond was a chaplain in the United States Army (with the rank of First Lieutenant) from 1918 to 1919. Returning from service, he became a curate at St. Clement Parish in Somerville, Massacnusetts, and was later named director of Catholic Charities (1926).

Bishop of Alexandria 
On December 16, 1932, Desmond was appointed the fifth Bishop of Alexandria in Louisiana by Pope Pius XI. He received his episcopal consecration on January 5, 1933, from Bishop John Peterson, with Bishops Joseph McCarthy and Francis Spellman serving as co-consecrators, at Holy Cross Cathedral in Boston. He established 10 new schools, 22 parishes, and 35 churches.

Daniel Desmond died from a heart attack on September 11, 1945, while visiting family in Massachusetts; he was age 61.

References

1884 births
1945 deaths
College of the Holy Cross alumni
People from Haverhill, Massachusetts
Roman Catholic bishops of Alexandria
Saint John's Seminary (Massachusetts) alumni
United States Army chaplains
World War I chaplains
20th-century Roman Catholic bishops in the United States
Catholics from Massachusetts
Military personnel from Massachusetts